Henri Belle (born 25 January 1989) is a Cameroonian professional footballer who plays as a winger for Nepalese Martyr's Memorial A-Division League side Three Star Club.

Career
Belle started his senior career at Coton Sport FC de Garoua, before he moved in the summer of 2009 to Union Douala. After a season there, he went on trial with the Swedish club Örebro SK in June 2010. He was signed on a six-month loan next month. Not being given a chance in the Allsvenskan, and refusing to play for the youth squad, his loan was terminated to mutual consent in late October.

Belle moved to Croatia at the beginning of 2011, signing with NK Istra 1961. He drew attention to himself both by good games and by controversy - by being the victim of racist taunts from some supporters and by hitting a ball boy. Belle grew to be the key player of the Istra 1961 team, and, thinking that he had overgrown his club, demanded to be transferred out, linking himself frequently with HNK Hajduk Split, but in the end signing with RNK Split. He scored his first goal for RNK Split in a 4–2 loss to Dinamo Zagreb.

After short spells at Boluspor in 2015 and FC Belshina Bobruisk in 2016, Belle signed a two-year contract for the Tunisian top-tier side CA Bizertin in January 2017, but left the club at the beginning of the summer transfer period, not having featured in a single match for that club.

In March 2018, Belle returned to Cameroon and joined Dragon de Yaoundé.

References

External links
 
 

1989 births
Living people
Footballers from Douala
Cameroonian footballers
Association football midfielders
Cameroonian expatriate footballers
Expatriate footballers in Sweden
Expatriate footballers in Croatia
Expatriate footballers in Turkey
Expatriate footballers in Belarus
Expatriate footballers in Tunisia
Cameroonian expatriate sportspeople in Sweden
Cameroonian expatriate sportspeople in Croatia
Cameroonian expatriate sportspeople in Turkey
Cameroonian expatriate sportspeople in Belarus
Cameroonian expatriate sportspeople in Tunisia
Allsvenskan players
Croatian Football League players
TFF First League players
Belarusian Premier League players
Union Douala players
Örebro SK players
NK Istra 1961 players
RNK Split players
Boluspor footballers
FC Belshina Bobruisk players
CA Bizertin players